The 2014 Liqui Moly Bathurst 12 Hour was an endurance race for a variety of GT and touring car classes, including: GT3 cars, GT4 cars and Group 3E Series Production Cars. The event, which was staged at the Mount Panorama Circuit, near Bathurst, in New South Wales, Australia on 9 February 2014, was the twelfth running of the Bathurst 12 Hour.

44 cars were entered for the race, though four entries were withdrawn due to crashes in practice and qualifying. John Bowe, Peter Edwards, Craig Lowndes and Mika Salo won the race for Maranello Motorsport, driving a Ferrari 458 GT3, after Lowndes won a close battle with German driver Maximilian Buhk late in the race. Buhk finished second for HTP Motorsport along with Thomas Jäger and Harold Primat, just four tenths of a second behind Lowndes. Greg Crick, Will Davison and Jack Le Brocq finished third for Erebus Motorsport, with Davison holding off Shane van Gisbergen in the closing laps despite having a damaged car. The Nissan GT-R Nismo GT3 had shown early pace but was involved in an early crash at the top of the circuit and did not finish.

Three Fiat Abarth 500s had been invited and were competing in their own class, with their lap times being much slower than the GT3 cars. A late safety car saw the three Fiats mixed in with the leading GT3 cars at the front of the safety car queue. The three drivers voluntarily drove through the pit lane as the race restarted, giving the leading GT3 cars a clearer track as they battled for position in the closing laps.

The 2014 race was the fastest ever contested to that point, setting a distance record of 296 laps (1839 kilometres), which was not broken until 2016.

Class structure
Cars competed in the following six classes.
 Class A – GT3 Outright
 Class B – GT3 (Older Specification)/GT3 Cup Cars
 Class C – GT4
 Class D – Invitational (over 3000cc)
 Class F – Invitational (up to 3000cc)
 Class I – Invitational (non-production)

Official results

 Note: Class winners are shown in bold.
 Race time of winning car: 12:00:29.5750
 Fastest race lap: 2:03.8506 – Shane van Gisbergen

References

External links

Motorsport in Bathurst, New South Wales
Liqui Moly Bathurst 12 Hour